Pauline Ng may refer to:
 Pauline Ng (politician), member of the Legislative Council of Hong Kong
 Pauline Ng (entrepreneur), Singaporean entrepreneur
 Pauline Ng (footballer), Hong Kong footballer